The 5 mm Remington Rimfire Magnum or 5 mm RFM is a bottlenecked rimfire cartridge introduced by Remington Arms Company in 1969. Remington chambered it in a pair of bolt-action rifles, the Model 591 and Model 592, but this ammunition never became very popular, and the rifles were discontinued in 1974. About 52,000 rifles and 30,000 barrels for the T/C Contender pistol were sold during its brief production run. Remington discontinued the cartridge itself in 1982, leaving owners with no source of ammunition.

In 2008, the cartridge was reintroduced by Mexico's Aguila Ammunition in collaboration with Centurion Ordnance.

Design 
Remington designed a completely new, bottlenecked case that was somewhat similar to the older .22 Winchester Magnum, but stronger to handle the higher pressure of the 5 mm at 33,000 PSI.

From 1982 until 2008, no ammunition manufacturers manufactured rounds for this cartridge. Some firearms manufacturers even created conversion kits to allow the existing 5 mm guns to shoot other more-common cartridges.

At the 2008 SHOT Show, Aguila Ammunition announced it would reintroduce the cartridge and begin commercial production of 5 mm RFM ammunition. Until 2019, the cartridges were sold in the United States of America under the Centurion brand. In 2019, Aguila Ammunition announced the company now offered two 5 mm RFM loads: one with a semi-jacketed hollow point bullet and a second with a full jacketed hollow point bullet. Both loads use a 30 grain projectile and have a muzzle velocity of 2,300 fps.

Performance 
The 5 mm RRM offers higher velocity than the .22 WMR and more energy than both the .22 WMR and the later .17 HMR. It offers improved performance on small-game and for varmint hunting, along with excellent accuracy.

5 mm Craig centerfire conversion 
When Remington discontinued production of 5 mm RFM ammunition, owners of Remington 591 and 592 rifles were left with excellent rifles but no ammunition for them. Mike Craig, in 1994, in Seattle, began work on a centerfire conversion of the 5 mm RFM, the 5 mm Craig. His company, Certech, also performed conversions of 5 mm rifles from rimfire to centerfire by altering the bolts and installing new firing pins, restoring them to use. Craig has since sold all the rights to the 5 mm Craig to Eagle View Arms of Shelton, Washington.

Firearms chambered for 5 mm RRM 
For a brief time, Thompson Center Arms offered firearms in 5 mm Mag.

At the 2008 SHOT show, Taurus International introduced the first handgun chambered for the 5 mm Remington Magnum Rimfire.

See also 
 Rimfire ammunition
 List of rifle cartridges
 List of handgun cartridges
 Table of handgun and rifle cartridges
 5 mm caliber

References 

Pistol and rifle cartridges
Remington Magnum rifle cartridges
Rimfire cartridges
Weapons and ammunition introduced in 1969